Tobia Polese or Tobias Polese (January 19, 1865 – 1905) was an Italian painter.

He was born in Torre del Greco, in the province of Naples, and studied in the Institute of Fine Arts of Naples. He graduated in 1882, and the next two years was able to win bronze and silver medals for his vedute. Among his works: Giovedì santo; Bimbo adorato; Come bolle!, and Gioie materne. This last painting was exhibited at Bologna in 1890. By 1898, he had settled in Buenos Aires, Argentina where he had established a studio.

References

19th-century Italian painters
Italian male painters
20th-century Italian painters
1865 births
1905 deaths
Painters from Naples
Italian genre painters
19th-century Italian male artists
20th-century Italian male artists